Hugh A. Reid  (sometimes known as "Hugh Reed"), (May 10, 1852 – December 22, 1928) was an American outfielder in the National Association. He played in one game for the 1874 Baltimore Canaries.

References

External links

1852 births
1928 deaths
Major League Baseball right fielders
19th-century baseball players
Baltimore Canaries players
Baseball players from Ohio